Sisara or Si Sara may refer to:

Places
 Si Sara, Gilan, Iran
 Sisara, Mazandaran, Iran
 Sisara, an ancient settlement in the Province of Burgos, Spain, according to the Greek historian Ptolemy

Music
 Sisara (Mayr), 1793 oratorio by Simon Mayr about the biblical story

See also
 Sisera, also spelled Sísara, a commander of the Canaanite army of King Jabin of Hazor, mentioned in Judges 4–5 of the Hebrew Bible